Mario Hernán Iubini Carreño (born 14 January 1954), frequently referred as Mario Yubini or sometimes Mario Carreño, is a Chilean former football player who played as a forward for clubs in Chile, Central America and the United States.

Career
Iubini played in his country of birth for Audax Italiano and Regional Atacama.

In El Salvador, he played for Atlético Marte, CD Santiagueño and Cojutepeque.

In Honduras, he played for Motagua and CD Olimpia.

In Guatemala, he played for Comunicaciones (1977) and Aurora FC (1978), scoring three goals for each club.

He won league titles with Comunicaciones and Aurora FC in Guatemala, CD Santiagueño in El Salvador and CD Olimpia in Honduras.

He also had stints with Aigle Noir in Haití and New York Celtic in the United States.

Honours

Club
Comunicaciones
 Liga Nacional de Fútbol de Guatemala: 

Aurora FC
 Liga Nacional de Fútbol de Guatemala: 

CD Santiagueño
 Salvadoran Primera División: 1979–80

Olimpia
 Honduran Liga Nacional: 1982–83

Individual
 Honduran Liga Nacional Top Goalscorer: 1977–78

References

External links
 Mario Iubini at PlaymakerStats.com

1954 births
Living people
Chilean people of Italian descent
People from Talcahuano
Chilean footballers
Chilean expatriate footballers
Audax Italiano footballers
Aigle Noir AC players
C.D. Atlético Marte footballers
F.C. Motagua players
Comunicaciones F.C. players
Aurora F.C. players
C.D. Olimpia players
Regional Atacama footballers
Primera B de Chile players
Chilean Primera División players
Salvadoran Primera División players
Liga Nacional de Fútbol Profesional de Honduras players
Liga Nacional de Fútbol de Guatemala players
Chilean expatriate sportspeople in Haiti
Chilean expatriate sportspeople in El Salvador
Chilean expatriate sportspeople in Honduras
Chilean expatriate sportspeople in Guatemala
Chilean expatriate sportspeople in the United States
Expatriate footballers in Haiti
Expatriate footballers in El Salvador
Expatriate footballers in Honduras
Expatriate footballers in Guatemala
Expatriate soccer players in the United States
Association football forwards